Charlie Mutch (31 August 1893 – 31 October 1974) was an Australian rules footballer who played with Collingwood in the Victorian Football League (VFL).

Notes

External links 

		
Charlie Mutch's profile at Collingwood Forever

1893 births
1974 deaths
Australian rules footballers from Victoria (Australia)
Collingwood Football Club players